Maxime Boilard (sometimes listed as Maxim Boilard, born June 26, 1978) is a Canadian sprint canoer who competed from the mid-1990s through 2004. He was born in Quebec City, Quebec. His career highlight was a fourth-place finish in the C-1 500 m event at the 2000 Summer Olympics in Sydney. He also won two silver medals in the C-4 1000 m event at the ICF Canoe Sprint World Championships in 2002 and 2003. He was a silver medalist in the C-2 500 m event at the 1999 Pan American Games in Winnipeg.

Since his paddling career ended, Boilard has become a successful businessperson in Quebec, founding CANU, a company that supports corporate leadership development. In 2008 and 2012, Boilard served as a French-language analyst for Radio Canada and Reseau des Sports at the Olympic Games, covering canoe-kayak and rowing. In 2008, he was selected as a member of the Governor General's Canadian Leadership Conference.

References

Sports-reference.com profile

1978 births
Canadian male canoeists
Canoeists at the 2000 Summer Olympics
French Quebecers
ICF Canoe Sprint World Championships medalists in Canadian
Living people
Olympic canoeists of Canada
Sportspeople from Quebec City
Pan American Games medalists in canoeing
Pan American Games silver medalists for Canada
Canoeists at the 1999 Pan American Games
Medalists at the 1999 Pan American Games
20th-century Canadian people
21st-century Canadian people